Euryderus grossus is a species of beetle in the family Carabidae, the only species in the genus Euryderus.

References

Harpalinae